The Sri Lanka Army Women's Corps (SLAWC) is a Sri Lanka Army corps. The headquarters of this corps is in Borella, Colombo and the corps has six battalions. The first battalion was raised in 1 September 1979.

The regimental insignia of this corps is Viharamahadevi in a boat surrounded by gold colour sea and a vignette. Every year, in 17th November the corps anniversary day is celebrated as in 1997's 17 November the regimental headquarters was created in Borella, Colombo.

Overview
The corps was set up with the assistance of the Women's Royal Army Corps of the British Army. It was identical in structure to its parent organization, and its first generation of lady officer cadets was trained in Britain. Candidates were required to be between eighteen and twenty years old and to have passed the General Common Entrance (Ordinary level) examinations, while the officer candidates must have passed the Advanced Level. Enlistment entailed a five-year service commitment (the same as for men), and recruits were not allowed to marry during this period. In the training course at the Army Training Center at Diyatalawa, recruits were put through a program of drill and physical training similar to the men's program, with the exception of weapons and battle craft training. Female soldiers were paid according to the same scale as the men, but were primarily limited to service in nursing, communications and clerical works. 

One officer, three nurses and four other soldiers participated in the Vadamarachchi operation, which lasted from 27 May 1987 to 11 June 1988. This was the first time that the women in the Sri Lanka Army participated in combat operations. Over 25 female soldiers were killed in action in 1997.

Units

Regular battalions
1st Sri Lanka Army Women's Corps (formed on 1 September 1979)
7th Sri Lanka Army Women's Corps (formed on 1 August 2010 at Myliddy, Jaffna)

Volunteer battalions
2nd(v) Sri Lanka Army Women's Corps (formed on 1 January 1996)
3rd(v) Sri Lanka Army Women's Corps (formed on 15 November 1997)
4th(v) Sri Lanka Army Women's Corps (formed on 10 February 1999)
5th(v) Sri Lanka Army Women's Corps (formed on 10 February 1999)
6th(v) Sri Lanka Army Women's Corps (formed on 10 April 2009 and disbanded on 6 July 2018)

Notable members
Lieutenant Colonel K.C. Weerasekara - One of the first batch officers of SLAWC and the first female battalion commander of Sri Lanka Army
Corporal M.L.K.R. Wilson - One of the first female soldiers of the army
Susanthika Jayasinghe - Sri Lankan Olympic athlete
Nadeeka Lakmali - Sri Lankan Olympic athlete

Order of precedence

References

External links
 Regular slawc battalions
 SLAWC Flag and Logo Details

Further reading
Sri Lanka Army: 50 Years On, 1949-1999 (1999 book)

Women's Corps
Women's Corps
All-female military units and formations
Organisations based in Colombo